few is the fifth full-length studio album by American rock band He Is Legend.

Production 
few is the band's first album to be produced via crowdfunding; the Indiegogo campaign ended December 3, 2015, with $71,894 raised against a $56,000 goal.

Track listing

Personnel 

He Is Legend
Schuylar Croom – vocals
Adam Tanbouz – lead guitar
Matty Williams – bass
Denis Desloge – guitar
Sam Huff – drums

Additional musicians
Bibis Ellison – vocals
Dustie Waring – guest guitar solo on "The Garden"
Josh Moore – guest vocals on "The Garden"

Production
He Is Legend – producer
Al Jacob – producer, engineer
Adam "Nolly" Getgood – mixing
Matt Tuttle – mastering
Brad Albright – artwork

Charts

References 

2017 albums
He Is Legend albums
Spinefarm Records albums
Crowdfunded albums